Yegor Alekseevich Petrov (incorrectly Aleksandrovich, ; 1862/1871, Yekaterinburg — 1918/1919, Irkutsk) was a Russian worker and deputy of the Second Imperial Duma from the Perm Governorate in 1907.

Literature 
 Петров Егор Алексеевич (in Russian) // Государственная дума Российской империи: 1906—1917 / Б. Ю. Иванов, А. А. Комзолова, И. С. Ряховская. — М.: РОССПЭН, 2008. — P. 456. — 735 p. — .
 Члены Государственной Думы (портреты и биографии). Второй созыв. 1907—1912 гг. / Сост. М. М. Боиович. — М., 1907. — P. 241. (in Russian)

1862 births
1918 deaths
Politicians from Yekaterinburg
People from Yekaterinburgsky Uyezd
Russian Social Democratic Labour Party members
Bolsheviks
Members of the 2nd State Duma of the Russian Empire